Kupsabiny (Sabiny), or Sebei, is a Kalenjin language of eastern Uganda.

Classification 
Kupsabiny and a dozen other languages form the Southern Nilotic branch of the Nilotic family. The closest relative of Kupsabiny is Sabaot, spoken across the border in Kenya.

Speakers 
There are about 360,000 people in the world who currently speak the language, most of them being native speakers of it. The number of speakers is currently growing and the language is considered developing. Although the language is spoken primarily by Sebei people, it is taught in many primary schools and even beyond to boost communication levels.

Language 
The language Kupsabiny of the sebei is solely spoken in Uganda. The native speakers of the language are the Sebei people, an ethnic group who live in Uganda. Kupsabiny is a Nilotic language; along with many other languages of the Nilotic peoples. The language is highly tonal. There are 9 vowels and 14 consonants. The language is written with Latin script since 1975 (revised in 2010).
Kupsabiny is taught in primary schools and is backed by literacy campaigns to help aid with communication across Uganda.

Phonology
13 consonants are in Sebei (Kupsabiny):

There are a variety of consonant allophones in Sebei (Kupsabiny):

Sebei (Kupsabiny) has 6 vowels:

Vowels with short and long vowel allophones listed in brackets are below:

Tone is marked as high, mid, or low.

References

Kalenjin languages
Nilotic languages
Southern Nilotic languages
Languages of Uganda